Advantages of Travelling by Train is a 2019 black comedy film directed by Aritz Moreno in his feature length directorial debut and written by Javier Gullón. The film is based on the novel Ventajas de viajar en tren by Antonio Orejudo and stars Luis Tosar, Pilar Castro, and Ernesto Alterio, among others. The plot concerns about  a series of tales within tales triggered by a conversation on a train.

The film received four nominations at the 34th Goya Awards including Best New Director and won the Feroz Award for Best Comedy Film.

Plot
After arriving home to find her husband completely crazy, young literary editor Helga Pato is forced to put him into a psychiatric clinic in the north of the country. On the return train journey, a stranger, to help pass the time, suddenly asks her: “Would you like me to tell you about my life?” He is Ángel Sanagustín, a psychiatrist who is investigating the story of the worst clinical case he has ever come across, that of Martín Urales de Úbeda, a paranoid. From account of Martín sister's Amelia, Ángel develops the story of Martín (rejected and been thrown a croquette by his father), who served as a fighter pilot destined in Kosovo, where he began a relationship with Dr. Linares, a cooperator working in a local hospital for kids, and who uneasily became a female escort involved via one of her clients (Cristóbal de la Hoz) in a heinous plot pertaining child sexual abuse, child pornography, and organ trade. It is only then revealed that Martín is not a fighter pilot and he was not in Kosovo, but he is a former garbage man working in Murcia who lost his arm during a bad working night, and later became utterly paranoid about fellow garbage collectors' true intentions. Furthermore, upon the story of Ángel's visit to Urales de Úbeda's family house near Las Ventas, Amelia is revealed to be Martín, who had otherwise gathered years of undisposed garbage in the basement.

After finishing Martín's story, Ángel gets off the train stop to buy provisions and invite Helga, leaving behind a red file full of stories, as the train starts again without waiting for him. Then the fiction develops Helga's backstory, starting with her disenchantment from a relationship with a best selling author and then her ensuing relationship with Emilio, a stand owner in Retiro whom with she begins a new romance upon meeting with their pet dogs, spiralling into an abusive relationship as Emilio gradually submits Helga to behaving like another dog. Upon reaching her lowest point and fantasizing with killing Emilio with a hammer and feeding his brain to dogs, Helga decides to kill him via poisoning. Yet rather than killing him, the supplied drug turns Emilio into a feces-gazing near-catatonic state, and so that is the reason why she gets rid of him in the psychiatric clinic. Helga is fascinated by the stories in the red file. Another story is that of the failed romance in Paris between Gárate (a man born with severe flaws in his skeleton with deluded expectations about relationships, women and, broadly construed, life in general) and Rosa (a woman with one leg shorter than the other one). Helga decides to try to publish the red file, and so she begins a search for Ángel, going to the latter's purported house in Galapagar, where she is told that Ángel is not a psychiatrist but a man suffering from a condition of personality disorder. Upon visiting the house in Las Ventas, Helga meets with Ángel in the garbage-ridden basement, which explodes in a seemingly spontaneous combustion. After surviving the incident and being seen giving consent to a neurosurgical intervention, Helga takes another train, meeting with a man looking like Martín.

Cast

Production 
A Spanish-French co-production, the film was produced by Morena Films and Señor y Señora alongside Logical Pictures and Ventajas de Viajar en Tren AIE, and it had the participation of ETB, and Movistar+, and support from ICAA and the Basque Government. It was shot in Madrid, Gipuzkoa and Paris. Shooting began on 10 December 2018.

Release

The film premiered in the Official Fantàstic Competition at the 52nd Sitges Film Festival in October 2019. Distributed by Filmax, it was released in cinemas in Spain on 8 November 2019.

Reception
Ricardo Rosado for the Spanish magazine Fotogramas gave the film three out of five stars calling the movie "brave and free", writing that "the movie can celebrate its own insanity unlike any other". Mikel Zorrilla from Espinof gave the film four out of five stars calling the film "a daring debut film that never ceases to surprise". Rubén Romero Santos of Cinemanía rated the film 3 out of 5 stars, deeming it to be "the most daring Spanish film of 2019" as well as susceptible of "hurting sensitivities".

Accolades 

|-
| align = "center" rowspan="7"|2019
| rowspan="2"|75th CEC Medals
| Best Actress
| Pilar Castro
| 
| rowspan="2"|
|-
| Best Adapted Screenplay
| Javier Gullón
| 
|-
| 25th Forqué Awards || Best Actress || Pilar Castro ||  || align = "center" | 
|-
| rowspan="4"|34th Goya Awards
| Best New Director
| Aritz Moreno
| 
| rowspan="4"|
|-
| Best Adapted Screenplay
| Javier Gullón
| 
|-
| Best Art Direction
| Mikel Serrano
| 
|-
| Best Makeup and Hairstyles
| Karmele Soler and Olga Cruz
| 
|-
| align = "center" rowspan="9" |2020
| rowspan="7"|7th Feroz Awards
| Best Comedy Film
| Advantages of Travelling by Train
| 
| rowspan="7"|
|-
| Best Director
| Aritz Moreno
| 
|-
| Best Screenplay
| Javier Gullón
| 
|-
| Best Main Actress
| Pilar Castro
| 
|-
| Best Supporting Actor
| Quim Gutiérrez
| 
|-
| Best Original Soundtrack
| Cristobal Tapia de Veer
| 
|-
| Best Film Poster
| rowspan="3"|Advantages of Travelling by Train
| 
|-
| 33rd European Film Awards
| Best Comedy
| 
| 
|-
| 7th Platino Awards
| Best First Feature Film
| 
| 
|}

See also 
 List of Spanish films of 2019

References

External links
 

2019 black comedy films
2010s Spanish-language films
Spanish black comedy films
French black comedy films
Morena Films films
Films shot in Madrid
Films shot in the Basque Country (autonomous community)
Films shot in Paris
Films based on Spanish novels
Films about mental disorders
Films set in Madrid
Films set in Kosovo
Films set in Paris
Films set on trains
2010s Spanish films
2010s French films